The Bachelor of Science in Public Health (BSPH) (or Bachelor of Public Health) is an undergraduate degree that prepares students to pursue careers in the public, private, or non-profit sector in areas such as public health, environmental health, health administration, epidemiology, nutrition, biostatistics, or health policy and planning. Postbaccalaureate training is available in public health, health administration, public affairs, and related areas.

The University of California at Irvine, Program in Public Health, Department of Population Health and Disease Prevention, has the largest enrollment of undergraduate majors in Public Health, with about 1,500 students including ~1,000 in the Bachelor of Science in Public Health Sciences, and another ~500 students in the Bachelor of Arts in Public Health Policy (2014). UC Irvine also offers a minor in Public Health for students of other majors.

The Council on Education for Public Health includes undergraduate public health degrees in the accreditation review of public health programs and schools.

See also
 Master of Health Administration
 Master of Public Health
 Upsilon Phi Delta

External links 
 Commission on the Accreditation of Healthcare Management Education (CAHME)
A list of CAHME-accredited programs by name
 The Association of University Programs in Health Administration (AUPHA)
 Upsilon Phi Delta
 

Science in Public Health
Public health